Miss Grand Nepal 2022 was the sixth edition of Miss Grand Nepal beauty pageant, co-organized by Izodom Nepal, Cosmo Group, and Bolly Club Group, held on 10 September 2022 at Hotel Shanker in Kathmandu. Fourteen national candidates, directly chosen by the central organizer through an online application and the audition round, competed for the title, of whom, Aishworya Shrestha from Bagmati Province was named the winner and then represented the country at Miss Grand International 2022 held on October 25, in Indonesia, but she got a non-placement.

In addition to the event organized by the Izodom Nepal group, another pageant with the same title, held in August 2022 by a former Miss Grand Nepal licensee, RK Entertainment Group, has been observed. However, the mentioned organizer has not been affiliated with the Miss Grand International pageant since 2019 due to license termination, and the winner and runners-up of that pageant are usually participating in other different international contests such as Miss Tourism International, Miss Scuba International, Miss Landscape International,
and Miss Multinational.

Background
Since acquiring the Miss Grand Nepal franchise in 2019, the Izodom Nepal & Cosmo Group only held the contest once in 2020, due to the COVID-19 pandemic, the country's representative on the international stage Miss Grand International was instead appointed in 2021. However, after the outbreak has been effectively controlled, the organizer then decided to arrange the national contest in 2022 to elect the representative for the international pageant in Indonesia. The press conference of such was held on 25 August in Kathmandu, and the final venue and the competition detail were also revealed in the event. The contestant application was open from 3 July – 10 August with the audition round on 27 August and the final coronation round on 10 September 2022 at Hotel Shanker, also in the capital Kathmandu.

List of Miss Grand Nepal 2022 audition round judges:

 Aanchal Sharma, model and actress
 Anup Bikram Shahi, model
 Ashish Rana, rapper and singer
 Chhiring Wangdi, social activist
 Nishu Jha, Miss Grand Nepal general secretary
 Suresh Tamang, Miss Grand Nepal national director

Pageant
In the grand final competition held on September 10, the results of all preliminary activities as well as the individual interview determined the 10 semifinalists. The top 10 delivered a speech related to the pageant campaign, Stop wars and violence, and were narrowed down to the top 5, who then competed in the question/answer portion,  After which Miss Grand Nepal 2022, and her three runners-up, were announced.

List of Miss Grand Nepal 2022 final round judges:

 Anup Bikram Shahi, model 
 Ashish Rana, rapper and singer
 Priya Sigdel, Miss Earth Nepal 2018

 Chhiring Wangdi, social activist
 Nishu Jha, Miss Grand Nepal general secretary
 Suresh Tamang, Miss Grand Nepal national director

The summary of the selecting process is presented below.

Results summary

Main placements

Special awards

Note
 : Qualified for the top 10 finalists automatically after winning the Miss Popular Vote

Candidates
The following 14 candidates competed for the Miss Grand Nepal 2022 title.

References

External links

 

Grand Nepal
Miss Grand Nepal